The 2005 IAAF World Cross Country Championships took place on March 19/20, 2005.  The races were held at the Hippodrome Joseph Desjoyaux in Saint-Galmier near Saint-Étienne, France.  Reports of the event were given in The New York Times, in the Herald, and for the IAAF.

Complete results for senior men, for senior men's teams, for men's short race, for men's short race teams, for junior men, for junior men's teams, senior women, for senior women's teams, for women's short race, for women's short race teams, for junior women,  for junior women's teams, medallists, and the results of British athletes who took part were published.

Medallists

Race results

Senior men's race (12.02 km)

Note: Athletes in parentheses did not score for the team result.

Men's short race (4.196 km)

Note: Athletes in parentheses did not score for the team result.

Junior men's race (8 km)

Note: Athletes in parentheses did not score for the team result.

Senior women's race (8.108 km)

Note: Athletes in parentheses did not score for the team result.

Women's short race (4.196 km)

Note: Athletes in parentheses did not score for the team result.

Junior women's race (6.153 km)

Note: Athletes in parentheses did not score for the team result.

Medal table (unofficial)

Note: Totals include both individual and team medals, with medals in the team competition counting as one medal.

Participation
According to an unofficial count, 695 athletes from 72 countries participated.  This is in agreement with the official numbers as published.

 (23)
 (1)
 (5)
 (16)
 (11)
 (7)
 (15)
 (1)
 (4)
 (12)
 (6)
 (34)
 (2)
 (2)
 (6)
 (2)
 (1)
 (1)
 (1)
 (4)
 (5)
 (19)
 (4)
 (28)
 (36)
 (2)
 (2)
 (3)
 (14)
 (1)
 (30)
 (29)
 (2)
 (3)
 (35)
 (2)
 (2)
 (7)
 (1)
 (30)
 (3)
 (2)
 (13)
 (4)
 (2)
 (4)
 (25)
 (1)
 (14)
 (5)
 (18)
 (5)
 (1)
 (2)
 (2)
 (1)
 (21)
 (36)
 (6)
 (3)
 (13)
 (4)
 (1)
 (11)
 (1)
 (33)
 (36)
 (1)
 (6)
 (1)
 (3)
 (8)

See also
 2005 IAAF World Cross Country Championships – Senior men's race
 2005 IAAF World Cross Country Championships – Men's short race
 2005 IAAF World Cross Country Championships – Junior men's race
 2005 IAAF World Cross Country Championships – Senior women's race
 2005 IAAF World Cross Country Championships – Women's short race
 2005 IAAF World Cross Country Championships – Junior women's race
 2005 in athletics (track and field)

References

External links
Official site
Website of the Local Organising Committee

 
2005
Cross Country Championships
IAAF World Cross Country Championships
International athletics competitions hosted by France
Cross country running in France
IAAF World Cross Country Championship